Ambient Devices, Inc. is a privately held company founded in 2001 and based in Cambridge, Massachusetts, USA that designs and markets various ambient devices for display of information ranging from weather to traffic reports to stock quotes.  The company was founded by David L. Rose, Ben Resner, Nabeel Hyatt and Pritesh Gandhi, and is a spin-off from the MIT Media Lab. The company also maintains the Ambient Information Network, a U.S. nationwide datacasting network presently hosted by U.S.A. Mobility, a U.S. paging service.  The service is similar to the discontinued Microsoft's SPOT service.

Products 
 Ambient Orb – March 2002
 Ambient Weather Beacon – 2003
 Ambient Weather Forecaster – 2004
 Ambient Dashboard – 2004
 Ambient Wireless Datacasting Kit – March 2005
 Ambient 5-Day Weather Forecaster launched at Brookstone
 Ambient Google Clock – (in development)
 Ambient Umbrella – 2007
 Ambient Energy Joule - 2007
 Ambient Flurry Alarm Clock - 2011

Services 
Ambient Devices ran a data network called "Ambient Information Network" that sends weather, stock market activity, sport scores, energy pricing and usage using a  paging network that utilizes encoded FM radio stations to send out a data broadcast signals to Ambient devices. Ambient stopped transmitting these signals in 2019, rendering devices that were dependent on them useless.

They also sell forecasting services to utility companies so that customers can reduce their energy usage when utilities are encountering peak usage and need an automated way of reducing energy consumption in homes and businesses.

Controversy 
Brookstone licensed and sold an Ambient device called the "Brookstone Weathercast Wireless 5-day Forecaster." Consumers who bought this weather reporting device found out in February 2018 that Ambient Devices would no longer be sending data to these devices, rendering them  e-waste.

References

External links 
 Official home page
 Device configuration, coverage areas, etc.
 Coopeland, Michael. How to ride the Fifth Wave, Business 2.0, 2005-07-01.
 Massachusetts Corporations Database listing
 Rubin, Ross. Switched On: Sweet dash eats cash, meets crash, Engadget, 2005-04-20, accessed 2007-03-16.
 Rubin, Ross. Switched On: The Ambient Dashboard moves the needles, Engadget, 2005-04-13, accessed 2007-03-16.
 Koprowski, Gene. Wireless without worries?, Forbes, 2004-07-30.

Multimodal interaction
Companies based in Cambridge, Massachusetts